The 1934–35 National Football League was the 8th staging of the National Football League (NFL), a Gaelic football tournament for the Gaelic Athletic Association county teams of Ireland.

Mayo won the league for the second year in a row, defeating Fermanagh in the final by 21 points, still the record for an NFL final.

Format 
There were four divisions – Northern, Southern, Eastern and Western. Division winners played off for the NFL title.

League Stage

Northern Division
 won.

Southern Division (Munster Football League)
 withdrew before the competition started.

Table

Eastern Division
??

Western Division
 won, ahead of Dublin, Louth, Meath, Galway, Laois and Kildare.

Knockout stage

Division Two

Leinster
Wicklow, Kilkenny, Carlow

Midland
Roscommon, Westmeath

Final

References

National Football League
National Football League
National Football League (Ireland) seasons